Retrocomputing is the current use of older computer hardware and software. Retrocomputing is usually classed as a hobby and recreation rather than a practical application of technology; enthusiasts often collect rare and valuable hardware and software for sentimental reasons.

Occasionally, however, an obsolete computer system has to be "resurrected" to run software specific to that system, to access data stored on obsolete media, or to use a peripheral that requires that system.

Hardware retrocomputing

Historic systems
Retrocomputing is part of the history of computer hardware. It can be seen as the analogue of experimental archaeology in computing. Some notable examples include the reconstruction of Babbage's Difference engine (more than a century after its design) and the implementation of Plankalkül in 2000 (more than half a century since its inception).

"Homebrew" computers

Some retrocomputing enthusiasts also consider the "homebrewing" (designing and building of retro- and retro-styled computers or kits), to be an important aspect of the hobby, giving new enthusiasts an opportunity to experience more fully what the early years of hobby computing were like.  There are several different approaches to this end. Some are exact replicas of older systems, and some are newer designs based on the principles of retrocomputing, while others combine the two, with old and new features in the same package. Examples include:
 Device offered by IMSAI, a modern, updated, yet backward-compatible version and replica of the original IMSAI 8080, one of the most popular early personal systems;
 Several Apple 1 replicas and kits have been sold in limited quantities in recent years, by different builders, such as the "Replica 1", from Briel Computers;
 A currently ongoing project that uses old technology in a new design is the Z80-based N8VEM;
 The Arduino Retro Computer kit is an open source, open hardware kit you can build and has a BASIC interpreter. There is also a version of the Arduino Retro Computer that can be hooked up to a TV;
 There is at least one remake of the Commodore 64 using an FPGA configured to emulate the 6502;
 MSX 2/2+ compatible do-it-yourself kit GR8BIT, designed for the hands-on education in electronics, deliberately employing old and new concepts and devices (high-capacity SRAMs, micro-controllers and FPGA);
 The MEGA65 is a Commodore 65 compatible computer;
 The Commander X16 is an ongoing project that hopes to build a new 8-bit platform inspired by the Commodore 64, using off the shelf modern parts.
The C256 Foenix and its different versions is a new retro computer family based on the WDC65C816. FPGAs are used to simulate CBM custom chips and has the power of an Amiga with its graphic and sound capabilities.

Software retrocomputing
As old computer hardware becomes harder to maintain, there has been increasing interest in computer simulation. This is especially the case with old mainframe computers, which have largely been scrapped and have space, power, and environmental requirements which the average user can't afford. The memory size and speed of current systems enable simulation of many old systems to run faster that that system on original hardware .

One popular simulator, the history simulator SIMH, offers simulations for over 50 historic systems, from the 1950s thru the present. The Hercules emulator simulates the IBM System/360 family from System/360 to 64-bit System/z. A simulator is available for the Honeywell Multics system.

Software for older systems was not copyrighted, and was open source, so there is a wide variety of available software to run on these simulators.

Some emulations are used by businesses, as running production software in a simulator is usually faster, cheaper, and more reliable that running it on original hardware.

In popular culture
In an interview with Conan O'Brien in May 2014, George R. R. Martin revealed that he writes his books using WordStar 4.0, an MS-DOS application dating back to 1987.

US-based streaming video provider Netflix released a multiple-choice movie branded to be part of their Black Mirror series, called Bandersnatch. The protagonist is a teenage programmer working on a contract to deliver a video-game adaptation of a fantasy novel for an 8-bit computer in 1984. The multiple storylines evolve around the emotions and mental health issues resulting from a reality-perception mismatch between a new generation of computer-savvy teenagers and twenty-somethings, and their care givers.

Education
Due to their low complexity together with other technical advantages, 8-bit computers are frequently re-discovered for education, especially for introductory programming classes in elementary schools. 8-bit computers turn on and directly present a programming environment; there are no distractions, and no need for other features or additional connectivity. The BASIC language is a simple-to-learn programming language that has access to the entire system without having to load libraries for sound, graphics, math, etc. The focus of the programming language is on efficiency; in particular, one command does one thing immediately (e.g.  turns the screen green).

It is possible to learn the basics of current IBM systems using simulation, without having access to a large mainframe.

Reception
Retrocomputing (and retrogaming as aspect) has been described in one paper as preservation activity and as aspect of the remix culture.

Internet
Though many retro computers pre-date widespread use of the Internet many enthusiasts find way to connect their machines using technologies such as Retronet that emulate the modems and X.25 protocol the machines were designed at the time to use.

See also
 Computer Conservation Society
 Computer History Museum
 History of computing hardware
 List of home computers by video hardware
 Living Computers: Museum + Labs
 Vintage computers
 Vintage Computer Festival

References

"Preserving Computing's Past: Restoration and Simulation" Max Burnet and Bob Supnik, Digital Technical Journal, Volume 8, Number 3, 1996.

External links
Retro Computer Museum, a computer museum in Leicestershire, UK with regular "come and play" open days
Retrocomputing Museum for re-implementations of old programming languages
RETRO German paper mag about digital culture
The Centre for Computing History The Centre for Computing History UK Computer Museum
Living Computer Museum Request a Login from the LCM to interact with vintage computers over the internet.
bitsavers Software and PDF Document archive about older computers
Vintage Computing Resources Active resources for retrocomputing hobbyists
Learning to code in a “retro” programming environment
Beginning Programming Using Retro Computing
LOAD ZX Spectrum Museum, a retro computing museum in Portugal mostly focused on the Sinclair line of computers

 
History of computing
Nostalgia